Franz Happernagel (born 25 December 1929) is a German sprinter. He competed in the men's 4 × 100 metres relay at the 1952 Summer Olympics.

References

1929 births
Living people
Athletes (track and field) at the 1952 Summer Olympics
German male sprinters
Olympic athletes of Germany
Place of birth missing (living people)